Crural intermuscular septum can refer to:
 Anterior crural intermuscular septum (Latin: septum intermusculare cruris anterius)
 Posterior crural intermuscular septum (Latin: septum intermusculare cruris posterius)